Weipoort is a village in the Dutch province of South Holland. It is a part of the municipality of Zoeterwoude, and lies about 6 km north of Zoetermeer.

The statistical area "Weipoort", which also can include the surrounding countryside, has a population of around 400.

References

Populated places in South Holland
Zoeterwoude